Aeaces can refer to two ancient Samians:
 Aeaces (father of Polycrates), who may have ruled Samos in the mid-sixth century BC. His sons Polycrates and Syloson also ruled Samos. 
 Aeaces (son of Syloson), grandson of the previous, who ruled Samos in the late sixth and early fifth centuries BC.

Ancient Samians